Witold Rybczynski (pronounced:) (born 1 March 1943) is a Canadian American architect, professor and writer. He is currently the Martin and Margy Meyerson Professor Emeritus of Urbanism at the University of Pennsylvania.

Early life
Rybczynski was born in Edinburgh of Polish parentage and raised in Surrey, England, before moving at a young age to Canada. He attended Loyola College in Montreal. He received Bachelor of Architecture (1966) and Master of Architecture (1972) degrees from McGill University in Montreal.

Career
Rybczynski has written around 300 articles and papers on the subjects of housing, architecture, and technology, many of which are aimed at a non-technical readership.  His work has been published in a wide variety of magazines, including The Wilson Quarterly, The Atlantic Monthly, and The New Yorker. From 2004 to 2010, he was architecture critic for Slate.

He taught at McGill University (1974–1993) and the University of Pennsylvania (1993–2012), and served on the U.S. Commission of Fine Arts from 2004 to 2012.  He now lives in Philadelphia and is Emeritus Professor of Architecture at the University of Pennsylvania.  He was married to Shirley Hallam, who died in 2021.

Awards and honors
Rybczynski's book Home: A Short History of an Idea was nominated for the 1986 Governor General's Award for non-fiction, and A Clearing in the Distance: Frederick Law Olmsted and North America in the Nineteenth Century won the J. Anthony Lukas Book Prize and was short-listed for the Charles Taylor Prize in 2000.

In 2007 Rybczynski was the recipient of the Seaside Prize and the Vincent Scully Prize, awarded by the National Building Museum. Rybczynski is a Senior Fellow of the Design Futures Council. In 2014 he received a National Design Award for Design Mind from the Cooper Hewitt Smithsonian Design Museum.

Rybczynski is an honorary fellow of the American Institute of Architects, and an honorary member of the American Society of Landscape Architects. He has received the AIA Collaborative Honors, and the Pennsylvania AIA President's Award. He holds honorary doctorates from McGill University and the University of Western Ontario.

Works

Paper Heroes: Appropriate Technology: Panacea or Pipe Dream? (1980)
Taming the Tiger: The Struggle to Control Technology (1983)
Home: A Short History of an Idea (1986)
The Most Beautiful House in the World (1989)
Waiting for the Weekend (1991)
McGill: A Celebration (1991)
Looking Around: A Journey Through Architecture (1992)
A Place for Art/Un lieu pour l'art: The Architecture of the National Gallery of Canada (1993)
City Life: Urban expectations in a new world (1995)
A Clearing in the Distance: Frederick Law Olmsted and North America in the Nineteenth Century (1999)
One Good Turn: A Natural History of the Screwdriver and the Screw (2000)
The Look of Architecture (2001)
The Perfect House: A Journey with Renaissance Master Andrea Palladio (2002)
Vizcaya: An American Villa and Its Makers (2006), co-written with Laurie Olin
Last Harvest: How A Cornfield Became New Daleville: Real Estate Development in America (2007)
My Two Polish Grandfathers: And Other Essays on the Imaginative Life (2009)
Makeshift Metropolis: Ideas About Cities (2010)
The Biography of a Building: How Robert Sainsbury and Norman Foster Built a Great Museum (2011)
 How Architecture Works: A Humanist's Toolkit (2013)
 Mysteries of the Mall: And Other Essays (2015)
 Now I Sit Me Down: From Klismos to Plastic Chair: A Natural History (2016) 
 Charleston Fancy: Little Houses and Big Dreams in the Holy City (2019)

See also
 Natalia Rybczynski

References
Notes

External links

Author page at Penguin Canada
Faculty page at University of Pennsylvania
Author page at Simon & Schuster

1943 births
Living people
Scottish people of Polish descent
Canadian architects
Canadian architecture writers
Canadian people of Polish descent
People from Surrey
Scottish emigrants to Canada
Urban theorists
Writers from Montreal
New Classical architects
McGill School of Architecture alumni